Daniel Jamesley (born 19 October 1996) is a Haitian professional footballer who plays as a striker for Dominican club Universidad O&M and the Haiti national team.

International career
On 25 March 2021, Jamesley made his debut for Haiti as a starter in a 2–0 World Cup qualifier win over Belize.

References

External links

1996 births
Living people
Association football forwards
Haitian footballers
People from Ouest (department)
Haitian expatriate footballers
Expatriate footballers in the Dominican Republic
Haitian expatriate sportspeople in the Dominican Republic
Don Bosco FC players
Don Bosco Jarabacoa FC players
Universidad O&M FC players
AS Capoise players
Ligue Haïtienne players
Liga Dominicana de Fútbol players
Haiti international footballers